Hazrat Sayyid Usman Marwandi, (1177 - 19 February 1274) popularly known as Lal Shahbaz Qalandar, was a Sufi saint and poet of present-day Pakistan and Afghanistan. 

Lal Shahbaz Qalandar was born in Marwand, Sistan to a family from Baghdad. He eventually settled in Sindh and helped many people in converting to Islam and was revered by the local Sindhi population. Lal Shahbaz Qalandar had also been reputed for performing many miracles and was seen as a very holy figure in Sindh.

The 19th century spiritual Sufi Manqabat Dama Dam Mast Qalandar is dedicated to Lal Shahbaz Qalandar and is widely popular in the sub-continent.

Names 

He is called Lal ("ruby-coloured") because of the ruby-like glow on his face/forehead and "Shahbaz" to denote a noble and divine spirit and "Qalandar" as he was a wandering spiritual man.

Lal Shahbaz Qalandar is sometimes called Jhulelal. The term Jhulelal means "red bridegroom". According to the Garland Encyclopedia, Lal Shahbaz Qalandar was referred to as Jhulelal (red bridegroom) because he was promised marriage to a daughter of his friend, but the friend died and later his friend's son refused to allow the agreed upon marriage, which caused Lal Shahbaz Qalandar grief.

Life 
Lal Shahbaz Qalandar, son of Syed Kabeeruddin, was born in Marwand to parents from Baghdad, Iraq. He later settled in Sehwan, Sindh under the reign of the Ghaznavid and Ghurids (today's Punjab, Pakistan). 

A contemporary of Rumi, he travelled around the Muslim world and settled in Sehwan, Sindh where he was eventually buried. There is evidence of his presence in Sindh in 1196 when he met Pir Haji Ismail Panhwar of Paat and he is believed to have arrived in Sehwan around 1251. There he established a meeting house (khanqah), taught in the Fuqhai Islam Madarrsah and wrote his treatises Mizan-us-Surf, Kism-e-Doyum, Aqd and Zubdah. Lal Shahbaz lived a celibate life.

In Multan, he met Baha-ud-din Zakariya of the Suhrawardiyya order, Baba Fariduddin Ganjshakar of the Chishtiyya and Syed Jalaluddin Bukhari. The friendship of these four became legendary. They were known as the Chahar Yar (In Persian "the four friends"). According to some historians, the four friends visited various parts of Sindh and Punjab (in present-day Pakistan).

This was also the time period when Ghiyas ud din Balban (reigned: 1266 – 1287) ruled India.

Shrine 

The shrine of Lal Shahbaz Qalandar was built by Feroz Shah Tughlaq in 1356, expanded by Mirza Jani Beg and his son Mirza Ghazi Beg of Tarkhan Dynasty, but was not completed until 1639, when Nawab Dindar Khan paved the courtyard with glazed tiles. The silver work on the gate, the balustrade around the tomb and the top of the dome was gifted by Mir Karam Ali Talpur of Talpur Dynasty. Later on the shrine was decorated with Sindhi 'kashi-tiles', mirror-work and a gold-plated door was installed by the late Prime Minister of Pakistan, Zulfikar Ali Bhutto. The inner sanctum is about 100 square yards with a silver-canopied grave in the middle, according to Nadeem Wagan, Cutharo silver donated by Sardar Mahboob Ali Khan Wagan (Chief Sardar of Wagan Tribe) on one side of the marble floor is a row of about  folding wooden stands, on which there is a set of copies of the Quran for devotees to read. On the other side, beside a bundle of incense, are rows of oil-lamps lighted by devotees. Thousands of devotees visit the tomb particularly every Thursday. The shrine is considered being the chief shrine for malangs and qalandars - adherents of a distinct Sufi order inspired by the teachings of Lal Shahbaz Qalandar.

Mela / Urs (Annual Fair) 
Lal Shahbaz's annual Urs (death anniversary), held on the 18 Sha'aban – the eighth month of the Muslim lunar calendar, brings more than two million pilgrims from all over Pakistan and parts of India, Bangladesh. Essentially, it is a south Asian affair.

The 2017 terrorist attack 

On 16 February 2017, a group claimed responsibility for a suicide attack on the shrine, which resulted in the deaths of 88 people. The following morning, the shrine's caretaker continued the daily tradition of ringing the shrine's bell at 3:30 A.M. and defiantly vowed that he would not be intimidated by the terrorists. Pakistani government and security forces have also launched a nationwide security crackdown and have recently killed 37 terrorists. The shrine's dhamaal, or meditative dancing ceremony, was resumed the very next evening following the attack.

See also
 Rabia Basri
 2017 Lal Shahbaz Qalandar Shrine Suicide Bombing
 Bodla Bahar
 Syed Nadir Ali Shah

References

 
1177 births
1274 deaths
Persian-language poets
Sindhi people
Sufi mystics
Sufi poets
Sindhi Sufi saints
Sufism in Pakistan
Sufism in Afghanistan
Sufism in Sindh
Hashemite people
Pakistani people of Arab descent
Afghan people of Arab descent
Shrines in Pakistan